Muck City is an unincorporated community in Lawrence County, Alabama, United States.

References

Unincorporated communities in Lawrence County, Alabama
Unincorporated communities in Alabama